An ice floe is a large pack of floating ice often defined as a flat piece at least 20 m across at its widest point, and up to more than 10 km across. Drift ice is a floating field of sea ice composed of several ice floes. They may cause ice jams on freshwater rivers, and in the open ocean may damage the hulls of ships.

Gallery

References

Sea ice